Álvaro Ramos Trigo (born 11 March 1950 in Montevideo) is a Uruguayan agronomist and politician.

Biography
An agronomist by profession, he is an important consultant.

A member of the National Party, he served twice as Minister:
Agriculture (1 March 1990 - 1 February 1993) during Luis Alberto Lacalle's tenure
Foreign Relations (1 March 1995 - 2 February 1998) of Julio María Sanguinetti's second government

Elected to the Senate, he served 1998–2000.

He was also a candidate for Vicepresident (1994 elections) and President (1999 primaries).

He is a lecturer at ORT University.

References

1950 births
People from Montevideo
Uruguayan agronomists
National Party (Uruguay) politicians
Ministers of Livestock, Agriculture, and Fisheries of Uruguay
Foreign ministers of Uruguay
Uruguayan vice-presidential candidates
Living people